Deirdre Gallagher (born 13 July 1974 in Ballina, County Mayo) is a retired female race walker from Ireland. She represented Ireland in the 1996 Olympic Games held in Atlanta.

Achievements

References

sports-reference

1974 births
Living people
Irish female racewalkers
Athletes (track and field) at the 1996 Summer Olympics
Olympic athletes of Ireland
Sportspeople from County Mayo
People from Ballina, County Mayo